Bolly may refer to:
Jorge Luis Bolly (born 1984), Mexican professional wrestler
 Mathis Bolly (born 1990), Norwegian-born Ivorian football midfielder 
 Monika Bolly (born 1968), Polish actress
 Bolly Lapok (born 1952), Metropolitan Archbishop and Primate of the Anglican Church of the Province of South East Asia and 13th Bishop of Kuching, a diocese in Malaysia
 Alex Drake (Ashes to Ashes), fictional detective in the TV series Ashes to Ashes

Bolly can also be an informal shortening of:

 Bollinger, a champagne house
 Bollywood, an informal term for the Mumbai-based Hindi-language film industry
 Bristol Bolingbroke, a Canadian Second World War light bomber aircraft

See also

Bollygum, various tree species
Bollywood (tree)
 
 Boly (disambiguation)